Juan Bertoli Calderoni (sometimes spelled Juan Bertoly Calderoni) was a nineteenth-century French architect from Bastia, Corsica,  and long-time resident of Ponce, Puerto Rico, where he designed various prominent structures including Teatro La Perla, Casa Serrallés (now, Museo de la Música Puertorriqueña), and Residencia Ermelindo Salazar (now, Centro Cultural de Ponce, at Calle Cristina #70) among various other historic building.

First years

Bertoli Calderoni was the son of Juan Ludovico Bertoli and Maria Luisa Calderoni. He came to Puerto Rico from Bastia, Corsica, in 1845, contracted by the Spanish Military Corps of Engineers to work at La Fortaleza and other Spanish military installations in San Juan. Subsequently, he moved to Ponce, Puerto Rico, seeking better recognition for his skills. In Ponce, he designed and directed the building of Teatro La Perla, the first neoclassical construction in Ponce.

Legacy
Among Bertoli's most distinguished works is the Teatro La Perla (1860s). He also designed the former downtown Ponce residence of the Ermelindo Salazar (1870) at 70 Cristina street. The latter was originally built as the residence of prominent Ponce businessman and subsequent Ponce mayor, Ermelindo Salazar; it was also the first headquarters of Museo de Arte de Ponce, and today is home to the Centro Cultural de Ponce. He also designed Casa Vives, the home of the owner of Hacienda Buena Vista.

Honors
 Bertoli is recognized at Ponce's Park of the Illustrious Ponce Citizens. 
 In Barrio Segundo, Ponce, there is a street named after him; the street leads to Castillo Serralles.

See also

 Alfredo Wiechers
 Francisco Porrata Doria

Notes

References

1885 deaths
Ponce Creole architects
Burials at Panteón Nacional Román Baldorioty de Castro
Architects from Ponce, Puerto Rico
1820 births